Rats in the Burlap is the ninth studio album by Canadian punk rock band The Real McKenzies. It was released on Fat Wreck Chords in 2015.

"Yes" is about the Scottish independence movement.

Track list

References

The Real McKenzies albums
2015 albums
Fat Wreck Chords albums